The Olympian: A Story of the City is a novel by the American writer James Oppenheim (1882–1932) set in turn-of-the-century Pittsburgh, Pennsylvania.

It tells the Horatio Alger story of Kirby Trask, who rises from the working-class to become a steel magnate.

References

1912 American novels
Novels set in Pittsburgh
Harper & Brothers books